I Think I'm Gonna Be Sick is the debut album by the Philadelphia grunge band Dandelion. The album includes an untitled hidden track, which band member Mike Morpurgo has referred to as "Tuesday." A European tour followed shortly after the album was released.

Track listing 

"Waiting for a Ride" (4:07)
"Under My Skin" (2:55)
"Nothing to Say" (3:03)
"Outside" (3:20)
"Onion Field" (6:02)
"Diggin' a Hole" (2:19)
"Thorn" (3:54)
"Play That Song" (3:12)
"I Can Remember" (4:53)
"In My Room" (5:20)
"Weight of the World"/untitled hidden track (13:15)

References

1993 debut albums
Ruffhouse Records albums